James Brandon (1734–1790) was an early pioneer in Rowan County, North Carolina and an officer in the North Carolina militia during the American Revolution.  He commanded the 2nd Rowan County Regiment from 1782-1783.

Life story
James Brandon was born in 1734, the son of John Brandon, Jr. and Maley Cathey.  In 1754, he married Elizabeth Armstrong in Rowan County, North Carolina.  He obtained Granville land grants on the north side of Fourth Creek in Rowan County in 1760 and 1764 and was a slave owner.  According to his will he had the following children:  William Brandon, Benjamin Brandon, John Brandon, Jane (Brandon) Wilson, Abel Brandon, Armstrong Brandon,   He served on the Rowan County Committee of Safety, before the Revolutionary War.  He died after the war in 1790 in Rowan County and was buried at the Thyatira Presbyterian Church Cemetery.

Military service
James served as an officer in the North Carolina militia during the American Revolution: 
 2nd Major in the Rowan County Regiment of the North Carolina militia -(1775)
 Major in the 1st Rowan County Regiment of the North Carolina militia (1775-1777)
 Major in the Rowan County Regiment of the North Carolina militia (1777-1780)
 Lt. Colonel in the Rowan County Regiment of North Carolina militia (1780-1782)
 Colonel over the 2nd Rowan County Regiment of the North Carolina militia (1782-1783)

The North Carolina General Assembly split the Rowan County Regiment into two regiments on October 22, 1775—the 1st Rowan County Regiment and the 2nd Rowan County Regiment. On May 9, 1777 when the Burke County Regiment was created, the 1st Rowan County Regiment reverted to the Rowan County Regiment.  On May 1, 1782, the Rowan County Regiment was split into the 1st and 2nd Rowan County regiments and Colonel Brandon was given command of the 2nd Rowan County Regiment.

Known engagements:
 1776, Cherokee Expedition
 April 14, 1780, Battle of Monck's Corners
 Spring of 1780, Siege of Charleston

References

 

North Carolina militiamen in the American Revolution
1734 births
1790 deaths